The Institution of Electronics and Telecommunication Engineers (IETE) is India's leading recognized professional society devoted to the advancement of science, technology, electronics, telecommunication and information technology. Founded in 1953, it serves more than 70,000+ members through 60+ centers/sub centers primarily located in India (3 abroad). The Institution provides leadership in scientific and technical areas of direct importance to the national development and economy. Association of Indian Universities (AIU), Union Public Service Commission (UPSC) has recognized AMIETE, ALCCS (Advanced Level Course in Computer Science). Government of India has recognized IETE as a Scientific and Industrial Research Organization (SIRO) and also notified as an educational institution of national eminence. The IETE focuses on advancement of electronics and telecommunication technology. The IETE conducts and sponsors technical meetings, conferences, symposium, and exhibitions all over India, publishes technical and research journals and provides continuing education as well as career advancement opportunities to its members.

IETE today is one of the prominent technical institution to provide education to working professionals in India and is fast expanding its wings across the country through its 60+ centres. Since 1953, IETE has expanded its educational activities in areas of electronics, telecommunications, computer science and information technology. IETE conduct programs by examination, leading to DipIETE equivalent to Diploma in Engineering, AMIETE equivalent to B Tech, and ALCCS equivalent to M Tech. IETE started Dual Degree, Dual Diploma and Integrated programs in December 2011. DipIETE is a three year, six semester course whereas AMIETE is a four year, eight semester course. IETE conducts examination for the above said courses, twice a year once in June and in December. Courses are divided into two sections, Section A and Section B. Courses of IETE are recognized by IISc, IIT, NIT, IIIT, IIM, CMI, TIFR, ISI, IIIT various Central and State Universities. IETE graduates are eligible to take national levels tests like GATE, CAT, JEST etc. for Masters as well as for PhD admissions in various leading technical institutions across the country. AMIETE by examination is recognized by the AICTE and MHRD, Government of India, as equivalent to B.E./B.Tech. IETE is a member of ECI.

References

External links 
 http://ietedelhi.org//
 http://www.iete.org/theiete.htm
 http://www.iete-elan.ac.in
 https://web.archive.org/web/20120510141642/http://iete.org/presidentmsg.pdf
 http://www.ietejaipur.org

Indian engineering organisations
Telecommunications in India
Professional associations based in India
Electronic engineering
Telecommunication education